

This is a list of the National Register of Historic Places listings in Montgomery County, Ohio.

This is intended to be a complete list of the properties and districts on the National Register of Historic Places in Montgomery County, Ohio, United States. The locations of National Register properties and districts for which the latitude and longitude coordinates are included below, may be seen in an online map.

There are 154 properties and districts listed on the National Register in the county, including 7 National Historic Landmarks. The city of Dayton is the location of 112 of these properties and districts, including 5 National Historic Landmarks; they are listed separately, while the remaining properties and districts are listed here.  A single property, the Miami Valley Golf Course and Clubhouse, is split between Dayton and other parts of the county, and it thus appears on both lists.  Another 2 properties were once listed but have been removed.

Current listings

Dayton

Outside Dayton

|}

Former listings

|}

See also

 List of National Historic Landmarks in Ohio
 Listings in neighboring counties: Butler, Clark, Darke, Greene, Miami, Preble, Warren
 National Register of Historic Places listings in Ohio

References

 
Montgomery